The Bhutan women's national cricket team, nicknamed The Lady Dragons, represents Bhutan in international women's cricket. The team is organised by the Bhutan Cricket Council Board, which has been a member of the International Cricket Council (ICC) since 2001. The team made its international debut against Qatar in 2009.

History
Bhutan made its international debut at the 2009 ACC Women's Twenty20 Championship in Malaysia. The team won its first match against Qatar (another international debutant) by 42 runs, but lost its four other group-stage games. However, in the ninth-place play-off against Oman, Bhutan won by 101 runs, and consequently finished the tournament ranked ninth out of twelve teams. At the tournament's 2011 edition, Bhutan again won only a single group-stage game, against Oman, and were defeated by Kuwait in the seventh-place play-off. The team returned to international competition at the 2013 ACC Women's Championship, where matches were played over 25 overs. In the group stage, Bhutan defeated both Malaysia and the United Arab Emirates, finished third. They went on to narrowly defeat Iran in the fifth-place play-off. Both Bhutan and Iran qualified for the 2014 ACC Women's Premier competition as a result of finishing in the top six teams.

In April 2018, the ICC granted full Women's Twenty20 International (WT20I) status to all its members. Therefore, all Twenty20 matches played between Bhutan women and another international side after 1 July 2018 will be a full WT20I. Bhutan made her Twenty20 International debut in Bangkok on 12 January 2019 against Hong Kong at the 2019 Thailand Women's T20 Smash.

In December 2020, the ICC announced the qualification pathway for the 2023 ICC Women's T20 World Cup. The Bhutan women's team made their debut at an ICC women's event when they played in the 2021 ICC Women's T20 World Cup Asia Qualifier group.

Records and statistics
International Match Summary — Bhutan Women
 
Last updated 22 June 2022

Twenty20 International 
 Highest team total: 126/2 v. Bahrain on 22 June 2022 at UKM-YSD Cricket Oval, Bangi.
 Highest individual score: 64*, Dechen Wangmo v. Bahrain on 22 June 2022 at UKM-YSD Cricket Oval, Bangi.
 Best innings bowling: 4/13, Sonam v. Nepal on 17 June 2022 at UKM-YSD Cricket Oval, Bangi.

T20I record versus other nations

Records complete to T20I #1143. Last updated 22 June 2022.

See also
 Bhutan men's national cricket team
 List of Bhutan women Twenty20 International cricketers

References

Cricket in Bhutan
Cricket
Women's national cricket teams
Women
Cricket women